The Pediciinae are a subfamily of flies in the family Pediciidae, closely related to Tipulidae (true craneflies). There are about 450 species worldwide.

Genera
Dicranota Zetterstedt, 1838
Heterangaeus Alexander, 1925
Malaisemyia Alexander, 1950
Nasiternella Wahlgren, 1904
Nipponomyia Alexander, 1924
Ornithodes Coquillett, 1900
Pedicia Latreille, 1809
Savchenkoiana Kocak, 1981
Tricyphona Zetterstedt, 1837

References

 

Pediciidae
Nematocera subfamilies